Kim Il-Nam (born 15 March 1980) is a North Korean long-distance runner who specializes in the marathon.

He competed in the 2008 Olympic marathon.

His personal best time is 2:14:38 hours, achieved at the 2008 Pyongyang Marathon.

References

1980 births
Living people
North Korean male marathon runners
Athletes (track and field) at the 2008 Summer Olympics
Olympic athletes of North Korea
North Korean male long-distance runners